Marchev (masculine) or Marcheva (feminine) is a Bulgarian surname. Notable people with the surname include:

Iliyan Marchev (born 1992), Bulgarian footballer
Veselin Marchev (born 1990), Bulgarian footballer

Bulgarian-language surnames